Maria Richwine (born María Agudelo, June 22, 1952 in Cali, Colombia) is a Colombian-born American actress who was also the first Latina Playboy Bunny.

Her first movie role was as Buddy Holly's wife Maria, in the 1978 biopic movie The Buddy Holly Story.  Her performance received positive reviews.  Newsweek critic David Ansen commented, "Her attractive performance suggests complexities of character that the script fails to explore."  She was a regular on Norman Lear's 1984 series a.k.a. Pablo, and also appeared in the television series Three's Company, Sledge Hammer!, and Freddy's Nightmares.

References

External links

 

1952 births
20th-century American actresses
Living people
Colombian film actresses
Colombian emigrants to the United States
American actresses
American film actresses
American television actresses
21st-century American actresses
21st-century American women